Loveyatri: A Journey of Love is a 2018 Indian Hindi-language romantic comedy film produced by Salman Khan under Salman Khan Films and directed by debutante Abhiraj K. Minawala. It is inspired by the 2006 Telugu film Devadasu. It stars newcomers Aayush Sharma, and Warina Hussain in the lead roles and was released on 5 October 2018.

Plot
The story starts with Sushrut "Susu" Pandya who meets Manisha "Michelle" Patel during a Garba festival. Susu is a local guy from Gujarat who wishes to open a Garba academy while Patel is a bright NRI student. They meet when she comes to Vadodara. Susu falls in love at first sight and wishes to meet Michelle again. During one of the Garba nights, Sushrut stays around Michelle and she accidentally hits dandiya on his eye. He fakes an injury. She calls him to apologize. Susu acts as if he was deeply injured.

He spends time with Michelle and they become good friends. Sushrut fearing he will lose Michelle if she finds out about his lie, reveals the truth himself to Michelle. Michelle says she already understood that the injury was fake as he goofed up and bandaged the incorrect side of his forehead. Also, he kept the bandage just for a day then forgot to put it.

After the 9 Garba nights were over, Michelle goes back to London with her father. Susu unable to bear the separation goes to meet Michelle. After almost one year, Susu met Michelle in London. However Michelle's father tries to keep them apart. Sam lied to Susu that Michelle has a boyfriend. Heartbroken Susu decides to return to India. Michelle tries to stop him but he was already gone.

Michelle sit in a park mourning over Susu's departure. Susu enters the park in a jeep and both Susu and Michelle does Garba together. Michelle tell Susu that the guy he thought was her boyfriend is actually gay. Sam realise his mistake and join the couple, wishing them a happy life ahead.

Cast

 Aayush Sharma as Sushrut "Susu" Pandya, Michelle's love interest and later husband
 Warina Hussain as Manisha "Michelle" Patel, Sushrut's wife
Naisha Khanna as Little Michelle
 Ronit Roy as Sameer "Sam" Patel, Michelle's father
 Ram Kapoor as Rasik Desai, Susu's uncle (mama)
 Pratik Gandhi as Nagendra 'Negative' Pathak, Susu's best friend 1
 Sajeel Parakh as Rakesh 'Rocket' Joshi, Susu's best friend 2
 Manoj Joshi as Natthu Kaka
 Kenneth Desai as Hari Pandya, Sushrut's father
 Alisha Prajapati as Khushboo Pandey, Negative's girlfriend & Michelle's friend in Vadodara
 Bilal Kazi
 Arnab Shah
 Amitabh Mishra
 Alpana Buch as Seema Pandya, Susu's mother
 Tainara as Mrs. Patel, Sam's wife & Michelle's mother
 Arbaaz Khan as Inspector Jignesh Ajmera, London Police (special appearance)
 Sohail Khan as Inspector Bhavesh Ajmera, London Police (special appearance)
 Amit Bhatt as Guest appearance
 Kyle Smith as Chris Cost, Michelle's friend in London
 Caroline Wilde as Kate Mathew, Michelle's friend in London
 Tordan Bhai as Chaiwala in Vadodara

Production
Salman Khan announced the film in 2017. He also confirmed via Twitter that the film would star his brother-in-law Aayush Sharma and would be directed by Abhiraj Minawala. Abhiraj was Ali Abbas Zafar's assistant director for Sultan and Tiger Zinda Hai. In February 2018, Salman announced that Warina Hussain would be the leading lady of the film. The film is the Bollywood debut for both Aayush and Warina. Loveyatri is a romantic drama set against the backdrop of Navratri in Gujarat. Aayush stars as a Garba teacher from Baroda, who falls in love with an NRI, played by Warina, when she visits the town during the festival.

The film was shot in two schedules. Several scenes were also shot in Vadodara in March 2018. This was followed by the second half starting in April 2018 in London. Principal photography completed in June 2018.

Soundtrack

Tanishk Bagchi, Lijo George – DJ Chetas and JAM8 composed the soundtrack of the film while the lyrics are penned by Shabbir Ahmed, Manoj Muntashir, Darshan Raval, Tanishk Bagchi, Badshah, Niren Bhatt, Yo Yo Honey Singh and Hommie Dilliwala.

The soundtrack of the film was released by T-Series on 3 October 2018.

Controversy 
A minor dispute emerged during the middle of promotions, in late September 2018, regarding the film's name. It was originally titled Loveratri, which is a play on the words "love" and "Navratri" (a religious 9 day celebration of the Hindu goddess Durga). However, the religious organisation Vishva Hindu Parishad felt that the title distorted the meaning of the festival and filed a complaint against the producers. A court in Bihar asked the police to file a First Information Report against the actor Salman Khan and the rest of the film's cast. On 18 September 2018, Khan announced on his Instagram page that the film's title would be changed from Loveratri to Loveyatri, with "yatri" meaning "traveller", thus changing the overall meaning approximately to "the journey of love".

However, the following day a Gujarat-based Hindu organization, Sanatan Foundation, legally filed a Public Interest Litigation move against the new name, claiming that it still sounded too similar to "Navratri". They sought another name change (possibly to "Love Ki Yatra"), changing the film's content, or to ban the film entirely for "hurting the sentiments of Hindus".

On 27 September 2018, the Supreme Court ruled in favor of the film's producers, stating that "no coercive action is to be taken in any part of the country against Salman Khan Ventures Pvt ltd." The ruling was submitted considering the film's status as having been cleared by the Central Board of Film Certification (CBFC), and yet had an FIR registered in Bihar against it and a criminal complaint pending in Vadodara, Gujarat.  The statement concluded by asserting that any further complaints, particularly those related to the contents or name of the film, would not be entertained.

References

External links
 
 
 

2010s Hindi-language films
Films shot in Gujarat
Films shot in London
Indian romantic drama films
Films distributed by Yash Raj Films
Films produced by Salman Khan
2018 romantic drama films
Hindi remakes of Telugu films